Air Chief Marshal  Shashindra Pal Tyagi, more commonly known as S P Tyagi, is an Indian Air Force officer who served as the 20th Chief of Air Staff of the Indian Air Force and served from 31 December 2004 to 31 March 2007. He was succeeded by Air Chief Marshal Fali Homi Major.

Controversies
Tyagi was briefly named in an Italian Investigation into bribes paid to secure a Helicopter Contract, although further information created doubts in the matter.  As per the unverified testimony of an Italian businessman, he received illegal payments to change the technical specifications of the helicopters which favored AgustaWestland which was finally awarded the deal. However, further investigation showed that the technical specifications were changed prior to his tenure on the orders of Brajesh Mishra, the National Security Adviser, in the Prime Minister's office (PMO). According to the investigators, 21 million euros (about Rs 150 crore) were paid as kickbacks under the cover of engineering contracts reportedly through companies IDS Tunisia and IDS India. A businessman named Sanjeev 'Julie' Tyagi, a close relative of S P Tyagi, one of the key suspects in the VVIP helicopter scandal, has denied reports filed in an Italian court, saying he had nothing to do with the 2010 defence deal. Detailed government documents revealed that the decision taken to change the technical specification were suggested and agreed upon by stake holders from multiple government agencies, including the Prime Minister's Office, the Special Protection Group (SPG), and others.

In April 2016, an Italian court said there was "reasonable belief that corruption took place" in the 2010 VVIP helicopter deal and that former Indian Air Force chief SP Tyagi was involved. Following necessary investigations, Tyagi was arrested by the Indian Central Bureau of Investigation on 9 December 2016.

In December 2016, Italy's Highest Court ordered a retrial of the case. In January 2018, the Italian courts said there was "insufficient proof that any bribery took place" and acquitted Giussepe Orsi (ex CEO) and Bruno Spagnolini (head of helicopter division) of all charges.

References

External links
 "S P Tyagi is new IAF chief" - Times of India article dated 1 January 2005
 एस पी त्यागी
  Middleman says he met SP Tyagi '6-7 times'

Indian Air Force officers
Chiefs of Air Staff (India)
Indian Air Force air marshals
1945 births
Living people
Ministry of Defence (India)
Recipients of the Param Vishisht Seva Medal
People from Indore
Indian prisoners and detainees
Corruption in defence procurement in India
National Defence College, India alumni